Rossella is a female given name. Notable people with the name include: 

 Rossella Biscotti, Italian visual artist
 Rossella Brescia, Italian television presenter
 Rossella Callovi, Italian road and track racing cyclist
 Rossella Como, Italian actress and television personality
 Rossella Falk, Italian actress
 Rossella Fiamingo, Italian épée fencer
 Rossella Giordano, Italian race walker
 Rossella Gregorio, Italian sabre fencer
 Rossella Jardini, Italian fashion designer
 Rossella Olivotto, Italian female volleyball player
 Rossella Ratto, Italian racing cyclist
 Rossella Tarolo, Italian sprinter

See also 
 Rossella (disambiguation)
 Rosella (disambiguation)

Italian feminine given names